Эль-76 is a programming language developed in 1972–1973. Primary orders in the El-76 language were created in 1972–1973. The language was created for the МВК ЭЛЬБРУС. Participants in the creation of the language were: Boris Babayan, V. M. Pentkovskii, S. V. Semenikhin, S. V. Veretennikov, V. Y. Volkonsky, S. M. Zotov, A. I. Ivanov, Y. S. Rumyantsev, V. P. Torchigin, M. I. Kharitonov, and V. S. Shevekov. Эль-76 was invented at the Institute of Precision Mechanics and Computer Science of the USSR Academy of Sciences named after S. A. Lebedev.

References

Programming languages created in 1972
Natural language and computing